Phyllonorycter silvicola is a moth of the family Gracillariidae. It is found in western Kenya at the eastern edge of primary rainforests intermixed with savannah vegetation.

The length of the forewings is 2.7 mm. The forewings are light ochreous with white markings. The hindwings are pale fuscous with a silver shine. Adults are on wing in late March.

Etymology
The specific epithet is a compound word consisting of two components in Latin: silva (meaning forest) and colere (meaning to dwell).

References

Endemic moths of Kenya
Moths described in 2012
silvicola
Moths of Africa

Taxa named by Jurate de Prins